Verbesina pentantha is a species of flowering plant in the family Asteraceae. It is found only in Ecuador. Its natural habitats are subtropical or tropical moist lowland forests and subtropical or tropical moist montane forests.

References

pentantha
Flora of Ecuador
Near threatened plants
Taxonomy articles created by Polbot